"Selma's Choice" is the thirteenth episode of the fourth season of the American animated television series The Simpsons. It originally aired on the Fox network in the United States on January 21, 1993. In the episode, Selma decides to have a baby, inspired by her late aunt's wish that she not spend her life alone. She experiences what life with children is like by taking Bart and Lisa to the Duff Gardens amusement park, which does not go as planned.

The episode was written by David M. Stern and directed by Carlos Baeza.

Plot
After watching an advertisement on television for Duff Gardens, Homer, Bart and Lisa decide to go there. As they prepare to leave, Marge tells them that spinster Great Aunt Gladys died and they will be going to her funeral instead. The Simpsons, along with Marge's sisters Patty and Selma, drive to Littleneck Falls to attend her funeral and the reading of her will. On the video will, Great Aunt Gladys advises Patty and Selma not to die alone, as she did. Selma hears the ticking of her biological clock, and decides she wants a child.

Selma tries video dating, a love potion, and flirting with a bag boy before eventually going on a date with Hans Moleman after revoking his license at the DMV. All goes well until Moleman tries to kiss her goodnight; Selma envisions herself as the mother of several ugly, blind children and kicks Moleman out of the car. Lisa then suggests to Selma that she try artificial insemination.

When the day comes for Homer to take Bart and Lisa to Duff Gardens, he falls ill from food poisoning after eating a long-since-spoiled hoagie that he brought home from a company picnic. In an attempt to give Selma a taste of motherhood, Marge arranges for her to take the kids to Duff Gardens while she stays home to look after Homer.

At Duff Gardens, Bart and Lisa wear Selma out, especially when they go on the Little Land of Duff ride and Bart dares Lisa to drink the "water". When Lisa takes a sip, she begins hallucinating and wanders away. While Selma is looking for Lisa, Bart gets trapped on a roller coaster. Lisa is found swimming nude in the Fermentarium by some workers and is returned to Selma.

Meanwhile, Homer feels better throughout the day, and he and Marge enjoy their time alone watching Yentl followed by The Erotic Adventures of Hercules. After returning Bart and Lisa home, Selma wonders how Homer manages to raise kids every day. She decides she can live without children for now and adopts Jub-Jub, Gladys' pet iguana.

Production
Writer David Stern said he wanted to go back to a "Patty and Selma episode", because it was sustained so well when he wrote "Principal Charming". He thought it was important to "keep these characters (Patty and Selma) alive." The animators had trouble with the size of the characters' pupils during the season. In this episode, they are noticeably larger. When the family watches the video will, Julie Kavner did five voices in the scene. When Great Aunt Gladys shows off her collection of potato chips, the scene was inspired by Myrtle Young, who appeared on The Tonight Show Starring Johnny Carson. During an interview with David Letterman, Young said she was working in quality control at a potato chip factory, and collected potato chips that looked like, amongst other things, famous people. The scene where Homer ate a chip is a reference to the Johnny Carson appearance, where, whilst Young was looking away, Johnny ate a chip from a separate bowl (not of the collection), Young, thinking Johnny had ate a chip from her collection, was shocked, before Johnny cleared up the misunderstanding. Jub-Jub made his debut appearance in this episode; the name of the iguana Jub-Jub came from Conan O'Brien.

Though research is usually done when real languages are used on the show, the foreign language heard on Selma's ham radio is fictional.

Cultural references
The episode title is a take on the 1982 film Sophie's Choice. Marge's flashback of her and her sisters swimming in a lake is based on The Prince of Tides. Later, Homer and Marge watch the movie Yentl, making it the second reference to a movie starring and directed by Barbra Streisand. The singers at Duff Gardens, Hooray for Everything, are a parody of the musical group Up with People. The group is seen performing a kid-friendly version of the Lou Reed song "Walk on the Wild Side". Homer and Bart start to sing "Ding-Dong! The Witch Is Dead" from The Wizard of Oz. The poem that Great Aunt Gladys reads at the start of her video will is "The Road Not Taken" by Robert Frost.  Duff Gardens is a parody of Busch Gardens, originally developed as a marketing vehicle for the Anheuser-Busch brewing company.  The song and ride that Bart, Lisa, and Selma go on, with animatronic kids from all over the world singing is a parody of the song "It's a Small World". The Duff Gardens parade is a parody of Disneyland's Main Street Electrical Parade. Lisa's hallucination after drinking the water on the ride is based on the work of artist Ralph Steadman, particularly in the novel Fear and Loathing in Las Vegas. When Lisa says "I am the Lizard Queen!", it is in reference to "Celebration of the Lizard" by The Doors. After acquiring Jub-Jub, Selma sings "(You Make Me Feel Like) A Natural Woman", a reference to the season four finale of the sitcom Murphy Brown, in which reporter Murphy Brown sings the song after giving birth to her baby.

Reception
"Selma's Choice" finished 27th in the weekly ratings for the week of January 18–24, 1993 with a Nielsen rating of 14.2.

The authors of the book I Can't Believe It's a Bigger and Better Updated Unofficial Simpsons Guide, Warren Martyn and Adrian Wood said, "A nice episode for Selma and good for Marge and Homer as well. But it's the kids who provide the highlights in this one, with their antics at Duff Gardens."

The author of Planet Simpson: How a Cartoon Masterpiece Documented an Era and Defined a Generation, Chris Turner said it "Fills in with the usual grab bag of great gags" and "The episode had some crowd-pleasing moments."
He went on to say, "The last few minutes of the show played out to continuous laughter [in the pub he was watching it in]".

References

Bibliography

External links

The Simpsons (season 4) episodes
1993 American television episodes
Television episodes set in amusement parks
Television episodes about funerals
Disney parodies